HM Prison Brixton is a local men's prison, located in Brixton area of the London Borough of Lambeth, in inner-South London. The prison is operated by His Majesty's Prison Service.

History

The prison was originally built in 1820 and opened as the Surrey House of Correction, Brixton Prison was intended to house 175 prisoners. However, regularly exceeding its capacity supporting over 200 prisoners, overcrowding was an early problem and with its small cells and poor living conditions contributed to its reputation as one of the worst prisons in London (worsened when Brixton became one of the first prisons to introduce penal treadmills in 1821). There is an illustration of prisoners on the 1821 treadmill used to mill corn in Surrey House of Correction.

Conditions for women were especially harsh as newly arrived female inmates were made to spend four months in solitary confinement and, following their introduction into the general prison population, would be required to maintain a condition of silent association. Female inmates were allowed over time to earn privileges, which included limited conversation, payment for labour, the right to receive letters and visitation rights.

Eventually the problem of overcrowding was addressed, with the prison expanding to house over 800 prisoners and, in 1852, the British government converted Brixton into a women's correctional facility after Van Diemen's Land (modern day Tasmania) became the final colony to refuse to accept women prisoners from England, under the penal transportation process.

Conditions in the prison gradually improved during the mid-19th century as a nursery was opened in the prison for children under the age of four and, by 1860, inmates were allowed to keep their children until the end of their prison sentences. Brixton eventually became a military prison from 1882 until 1898 and remained a trial-and-remand prison for London and the Home Counties until 2012. The footings for the treadmill remain and are visible and the former condemned cell is now an enlarged cell with six beds. A 1902 photograph shows the newly-built execution shed, which was never used and was repurposed as a staff gym.

On 7 July 1991 two Provisional IRA prisoners, Pearse McAuley and Nessan Quinlivan, escaped from the prison by subduing a guard. They managed to scale the walls and hijack the car of a passing member of the public before reaching the Baker Street Underground station. They managed to flee to the Republic of Ireland.

Recent history
In October 1999, Prisons Minister Paul Boateng had to make an emergency visit to Brixton Prison after a spate of multiple suicide attempts by inmates being held in the medical wards of the jail. The minister subsequently promised more nurses and staff for the prison's healthcare unit. A month later, Boateng threatened to privatise Brixton Prison if improvements were not made by management to the regime and conditions at the jail. In the spring of 2000 a surprise inspection by HM Inspectorate of Prisons resulted in the Director of the Prison Service being summoned to see the appalling conditions in which prisoners with mental health issues were being kept. The governor was removed the same day, only to be reappointed to run HM Prison Downview a few weeks later. It was also noted that cell call buzzers had been sabotaged by prison officers so as not to be disturbed during their shifts, only a small light remaining operational to indicate activation of a cell emergency call.  In August 2000, prison officers from all over the UK staged an illegal strike after the government released proposals confirming intentions to privatise Brixton Prison. The privatisation plans were subsequently dropped, and Brixton Prison has remained in the public sector.

In January 2001, an inspection report from the Chief Inspector of Prisons severely criticised conditions at Brixton Prison. The report claimed that staff had falsified records and tried to sabotage the inspection. Standards of healthcare and race relations within the prison were also criticised.

In June 2004, a further inspection report praised Brixton Prison for improving standards. The report highlighted the prisons good staff-prisoner relations and improved support for new prisoners. However, inspectors highlighted overcrowding as a major issue that was hampering further improvements at the jail. Another inspection report in July 2006 stated that poor facilities were holding back improvements being made to Brixton Prison. The prison's kitchens, healthcare and sports facilities were highlighted as being particularly inadequate.

In October 2008, the Chief Inspector of Prisons warned that many inmates held at Brixton Prison were taking drugs, and this was leading to violent attacks amongst gangs at the prison. The inspector also claimed that the prison was infested with vermin.

A further inspection was carried out in 2014.  The report stated that conditions had improved although there were still concerns regarding levels of violence, incidents of self-harm, overcrowding and offender management.

The prison today

HMP Brixton no longer acts as a local prison, having been changed to a Category C training establishment in 2012. Accommodation at Brixton comprises four main residential units, plus a health care unit. A new kitchen has been built and plans are in discussion to replace the reception, healthcare, and sports complex.

Inmates can pursue a range of education courses at the learning and skills centre. These courses include information technology, English, maths, social and life skills and a varied art programme. Most courses lead to nationally recognised qualifications. The gym also offers physical education and accredited programmes. The Windmill Centre is a traditional workshop located where the old kitchens were.

The Family and Visitor's Centre at Brixton is run by the Prison Advice & Care Trust (pact), an independent charity.

HMP Brixton is no longer the remand prison for Southwark Crown Court. This is now the job of HMP Wandsworth. Nor does it temporarily lodge prisoners appearing at the Court of Appeal Criminal Division (COACD) held at the Royal Courts of Justice (RCJ). That is now done at HMP Pentonville.

HMP Brixton was the setting of Gordon Ramsay's 2012 British television series Gordon Behind Bars, where he teaches a brigade of 12 inmates to cook, cater and, after the first four weeks, give back to society by selling on the produce. It was shown on Channel 4 in June and July 2012.

Notable former inmates
 Bertrand Russell, philosopher, mathematician and advocate of social reform
 Terence MacSwiney, former Lord Mayor of Cork. MacSwiney subsequently went on hunger strike and died at the prison.
 Roger Casement, civil rights investigator, diplomat, Irish nationalist
 Oswald Mosley, founder of the British Union of Fascists, was interned in Brixton in 1940 under Defence Regulation 18B
 George Lansbury, a Socialist politician and eventual leader of the Labour Party
 Barry Domvile, Neil Francis Hawkins, Archibald Maule Ramsay and Alexander Raven Thomson (political prisoners detained for opposing the Second World War)
 Brian Behan, a trade unionist
 Simon Dee, a television interviewer and radio disc jockey
 Gerard Tuite, formerly a senior member of the Provisional IRA escaped from Brixton in 1980
 Jimmy Moody, a gangster and hitman escaped with Tuite in 1980.
 Nessan Quinlivan and Pearse McAuley, suspected members of the Provisional IRA escaped from Brixton in 1991
 Cahir Healy M.P. Irish nationalist,
 Dolours Price and Marian Price, sisters, Irish nationalists.
 Mick Jagger, singer from the Rolling Stones.
 Bertrand Gachot, former Formula One driver.
 Hugh G. Hambleton, Professor at University Laval, Quebec city (Canada)
 Giggs, rapper from Peckham.
 Udham Singh, assassinated Sir Michael Francis O'Dwyer (13 March 1940), to avenge the Amritsar Massacre.
The Kray Twins, remanded in Brixton from late 1968 to early 1969, when they were convicted.
Denis MacShane
 Glenn Danzig and Jerry Only of Punk Rock band The Misfits spent two nights in the prison following a street fight. They wrote and recorded the song 'London Dungeon' about the experience.
 Imran Ahmad Khan, former MP.

References

Further reading
Babington, Anthony. The English Bastille: A History of Newgate Gaol and Prison Conditions in Britain, 1188-1902. New York: St. Martin's Press, 1971.
Herber, Mark. Criminal London: A Pictorial history from Medieval Times to 1939. Chichester, UK: Phillimore, 2002.
Roth, Mitchel P. Prisons and Prison Systems: A Global Encyclopedia. Westport, Connecticut: Greenwood Publishing Group, 2006.

External links
Ministry of Justice pages on HMP Brixton
HMP Brixton - HM Inspectorate of Prisons Reports

1820 establishments in England
Buildings and structures in the London Borough of Lambeth
Brixton
Brixton
Brixton
Brixton
Brixton